Thézan is the name of two French communes:
 Thézan-lès-Béziers in the Hérault department
 Thézan-des-Corbières in the Aude department